The British Society of Master Glass Painters (BSMGP), was found in 1921, it is British trade association for the art and craft of stained glass. It promotes the trade of glass painting and staining in Britain.

BSMGP activities include: lectures, conferences, exhibitions, forums, guided walks and other events; an annual journal, quarterly newsletter and other publications.  The Society also houses an extensive reference library and illustrated online design portfolios.

References

External links
 The British Society of Master Glass Painters

Glass makers
Crafts organizations
Design institutions
Architecture organisations based in the United Kingdom
Arts organizations established in 1921
Arts organisations based in the United Kingdom
1921 establishments in the United Kingdom